"Robin (The Hooded Man)", is a hit song from Irish group Clannad. The original version of the song appears on the Legend album. The version that appears on this EP was re-recorded for the third series of the HTV series Robin of Sherwood. This new version of the song has yet to appear on any other release.

Track listing
7" vinyl (PB 40681)
 "Robin (The Hooded Man) [new version]"
 "Caisleán Óir"
 "Now Is Here"
 "Herne"

References

1989 EPs
Clannad songs